The Burmese cat (Băma kyaung,  or , meaning copper colour) is a breed of domestic cat, originating in Burma, believed to have its roots near the Thai-Burma border and developed in the United States and Britain.

Most modern Burmese are descendants of one female cat called Wong Mau, which was brought from Burma to America in 1930 and bred with American Siamese. From there, American and British breeders developed distinctly different Burmese breed standards, which is unusual among pedigreed domestic cats. Most modern cat registries do not formally recognize the two as separate breeds, but those that do refer to the British type as the European Burmese.

Originally, all Burmese cats were dark brown (sable), but are now available in a wide variety of colours; formal recognition of these also varies by standard. Both versions of the breed are known for their uniquely social and playful temperament and persistent vocalization.

History

In 1871, Harrison Weir organized a cat show at the Crystal Palace. A pair of Siamese cats were on display that closely resembled modern American Burmese cats in build, thus probably similar to the modern Tonkinese breed. The first attempt to deliberately develop the Burmese in the late 19th century in Britain resulted in what were known as Chocolate Siamese rather than a breed in their own right; this view persisted for many years, encouraging crossbreeding between Burmese and Siamese in an attempt to more closely conform to the Siamese build. The breed thus slowly died out in Britain.

Dr. Joseph Cheesman Thompson imported Wong Mau, a brown female cat, into San Francisco in 1930. Dr Thompson considered the cat's build to be sufficiently different from the Siamese to still have potential as a fully separate breed. Wong Mau was bred with Tai Mau, a seal point Siamese, and then bred with her son to produce dark brown kittens that became the foundation of a new, distinctive strain of Burmese. In 1936, the Cat Fanciers' Association (CFA) granted the breed formal recognition. However, due to continued extensive outcrossing with Siamese cats to increase the population, the original type was overwhelmed, and the CFA suspended breed recognition a decade later. Attempts by various American breeders to refine the unique Burmese standard persisted, however, and in 1954, the CFA lifted the suspension permanently. In 1958, the United Burmese Cat Fanciers (UBCF) compiled an American judging standard that has remained essentially unchanged since its adoption.

Meanwhile, in the UK, interest in the breed was reviving. The cats that composed the new British breeding program were of a variety of builds, including some imported from America. By 1952, three true generations had been produced in Britain and the breed was recognized by the United Kingdom's Governing Council of the Cat Fancy (GCCF). Since the 1950s, countries in the Commonwealth and Europe started importing British Burmese; as a result, most countries have based their standard on the British model.

Historically, the two versions of the breed were kept strictly distinct genetically. British Burmese (also known as "traditional") were declassed as a breed by the CFA in the 1980s. The GCCF banned the registration of all Burmese imported from America in order to preserve the "traditional" bloodlines. Most modern cat registries do not formally recognize these dual standards as representing separate breeds, but those that do refer to the British type as the European Burmese. Recently, the International Cat Association (TICA) and CFA clubs have started using the American breed standard at select shows in Europe.

During the early period of breed development, it became clear that Wong Mau herself was genetically a crossbreed between a Siamese and Burmese type. This early crossbreed type was later developed as a separate breed, known today as the Tonkinese. Burmese cats have also been instrumental in the development of the Bombay and the Burmilla, among others.

Description

Appearance
The two standards differ mainly in head and body shape. The British or traditional ideal tends toward a more slender, long-bodied cat with a wedge-shaped head, large pointed ears, long tapering muzzle and moderately almond-shaped eyes. The legs should likewise be long, with neat oval paws. The tail tapers to medium length. The American (also called "contemporary") Burmese is a noticeably stockier cat, with a much broader head, round eyes and distinctively shorter, flattened muzzle; the ears are wider at the base. Legs and tail should be proportionate to the body, medium-length, and the paws also rounded.

Coat and color

In either standard, the coat should be very short, fine and glossy, with a satin-like finish. Color is solid and must be uniform over the body, only gradually shading to lighter underparts. Faint colorpoint markings may be visible, but any barring or spotting is considered a serious fault. The eyes are green or gold depending on coat color.

The breed's original standard color is a distinctively rich dark brown, variously known as sable (USA), brown (UK, Australia) or seal (New Zealand). It is the result of the Burmese gene (cb), part of the albino series. This gene causes a reduction in the amount of pigment produced, converting black into brown and rendering all other colours likewise paler than their usual expression. The action of the gene also produces the modified colorpoint effect, which is more noticeable in young kittens.

The first blue Burmese was born in 1955 in Britain, followed by red, cream, and tortoiseshell over the next decades. Champagne ("chocolate" in the UK) first appeared in America. Platinum (UK "lilac"), the last major variant to appear, was likewise developed in America beginning in 1971. Currently, the British GCCF standard recognises solid brown, chocolate, blue, lilac, red and cream, as well as the tortoiseshell pattern on a base of brown, chocolate, blue or lilac.

In America, champagne, blue, and platinum cats were first formally considered a separate breed, the Malayan, in 1979. This distinction was abolished in 1984, but until 2010, the CFA continued to place the sable Burmese into a separate division, bundling all other recognised colors into a "dilute division" and judging them separately. Currently, the CFA standard still recognises the Burmese only in solid sable, blue, champagne, and platinum.

Other colors have been developed from this initial base set, with varying degrees of popularity and recognition. In 1989 a cinnamon breeding programme was started in the Netherlands; the first fawn kitten was born in 1998. Cinnamon, fawn, caramel, and apricot Burmese have also been developed in New Zealand, as have tortoiseshell variants of all these colors. A new colour mutation ("Russet") appeared in New Zealand in 2007. This line has an initially dark pigment in the cats' coats, which fades as they grow, eventually becoming a paler orange color.

Temperament

Burmese are a notably people-oriented breed, maintaining their kitten-like energy and playfulness into adulthood. They are also said to have a number of overtly puppy-like characteristics, forming strong bonds with their owners and gravitating toward human activity. The cats often learn to play games such as 'fetch' and 'tag'. Veterinarian Joan O. Joshua has written that the "dog-like attachment to the owners" of the Burmese, as with the similarly behaving Abyssinians, causes "greater dependence on human contacts". This stands in contrast to the mere "tolerant acceptance of human company" based around "comforts" that other breeds display. They are persistently vocal, in a manner reminiscent of their Siamese ancestry, yet they have softer, sweeter voices. Burmese are not as independent as other breeds and are not suited to being left alone for extended periods of time.

Genetics

The Burmese gene is also present in some other cat breeds, particularly the established rex breeds, where it can be fully expressed in its homozygous form (cbcb) (referred to as Burmese Colour Restriction or Sepia). The same gene can also be combined with the Siamese gene (cbcs) to produce either darker points or a light-on-dark-brown coat, similar to the Burmese chocolate/champagne, known as "mink".

The Asian domestic cat breed is related to the Burmese; the Asian is physically similar but comes in different patterns and colours. The Singapura is always homozygous for the Burmese gene, combining it with a ticked tabby pattern. Snow Bengals with eye colours other than blue also have the gene.

Genetic diversity

A 2008 study conducted at UC Davis by the team led by feline geneticist Dr Leslie Lyons found that the American Burmese has the second lowest level of genetic diversity (after the Singapura) of all the breeds studied, and concludes that this situation should be addressed. The CFA observes that "breeders are reporting less hearty litters, smaller adults, smaller litters, and immune system problems, all of which point towards inbreeding depression becoming more common." The Burmese breed council currently allows outcrossing using Bombay, Tonkinese and Burmese type cats imported from Southeast Asia to improve genetic diversity. The Fédération Internationale Féline (FIFe) excludes novice show cats from breeding.

Health issues

Burmese cats in Europe and Australia are at increased risk of diabetes mellitus compared to other breeds. American Burmese do not share this increased risk, due to the genetic differences between American Burmese and other Burmese. The incidence of flat-chested kitten syndrome was at one time believed to be particularly prevalent in the Burmese breed, but recent studies have cast some doubt on this hypothesis. A study funded by the UK Burmese Cat Club in 1980 was inconclusive. The breed has an average lifespan of 10 to 17 years.

Certain UK bloodlines suffer from an acute teething disorder in young kittens (FOPS: Feline Orofacial Pain Syndrome), where the eruption of the second teeth causes extreme discomfort and the young cat tears at its face to try to alleviate the pain. Eruption of the new teeth in the jaw that causes the problem; these cannot be removed until they have erupted, by which time the problem ceases. Pain relief intervention should be considered, to prevent overt self-trauma. Apart from scarring caused by the self-mutilation, the cat seems to recover completely.

Hypokalemia, a genetic disease that is characterized by low serum potassium levels, has also been seen in the British Burmese and can similarly be traced to certain bloodlines. The gene is recessive, and both parents must carry it for the kittens to develop the problem. A carrier mated to a non-carrier may pass the problem on unnoticed for several generations. Clinical signs include skeletal muscle weakness, which is often episodic in nature and either affects the whole cat or is localised to the neck muscles. As a consequence, the cat can have difficulty in walking and holding their head correctly. In extreme cases, the clinical symptoms can result in death, if unattended medically. Hypokalemic cats can usually lead a normal life if they get the correct potassium supplement. Onset of symptoms often occurs around puberty and many may never experience another attack. A DNA test is now available to identify cats affected by or carrying this recessive gene.

Genetic testing for abnormalities

DNA tests are available for three genetic abnormalities that have been found in Burmese: the Burmese head defect, GM2 Gangliosidosis, and Hypokalaemia. Breeders are currently taking steps to ensure that these genes are carefully eliminated from the Burmese gene pool. It is thought that some genes are only found in certain populations of Burmese; the head defect in particular is not known to be present in British Burmese, presumably as a result of stringent import regulations in the modern GCCF Burmese registration policy.

See also

List of cat breeds
Tonkinese cat, a domestic cat breed produced by crossbreeding between Siamese and Burmese cats.
Puppy cat

References

External links

 4th printing
National Alliance of Burmese Breeders, a CFA-affiliated Burmese Club
Burmese pedigree database
Burmese-Burmilla pedigree database
New Zealand Burmese Cat Club
UK Burmese Cat Association
The Burmese Cat Club
Burmese Brown Cat Breeds Characteristics and more also read about another brown cat breed York Chocolate 
UK Burmese Cat Society
United Burmese Cat Fanciers (UBCF) a non-affiliated global Burmese Cat Club

Articles containing video clips
Cat breeds originating in Thailand
Cat breeds
Cat breeds originating in Myanmar